Sara Vernetta Finney-Johnson (born January 25, 1957) is an American television producer, writer, and playwright. She is best known as the co-creator, with Ralph Farquhar and Vida Spears, of the UPN sitcoms Moesha, starring Brandy, and The Parkers, starring Countess Vaughn and Mo'Nique.

Before Moesha, Finney-Johnson and Spears had been a long-term writing team, the first African-American female writing team in the television industry.. Her other credits as a writer include The Jeffersons, 227, and The Parent 'Hood. Along with Spears, she served as a writer and story editor on The Facts of Life and Family Matters, where they also later served as producers.

Born in Mobile, Alabama and raised in Los Angeles, California, Finney-Johnson is a graduate of the University of Southern California. In addition to her work in television, Finney-Johnson also works in theater as a playwright and producer. With Erwin Washington, she founded the Los Angeles Black Playwrights group in 1986.

Finney was married to Robert Lee Johnson, Jr., a financial broker and artist; he died in 2014.

References

External links

Television producers from California
Women television producers
African-American television producers
American television writers
Living people
American women television writers
1957 births
American women screenwriters